Ebergötzen is a village in the District of Göttingen in Germany in Lower Saxony. It is 15 km from Göttingen and belongs to the Samtgemeinde Radolfshausen. Ebergötzen has 1,927 inhabitants (December 2020).

Ebergötzen has achieved some fame as being the place where Wilhelm Busch, author of the Max und Moritz stories that make many consider him the "Father of the Comic Strip", spent large parts of his childhood. Wilhelm Busch lived there from 1841 to 1846, staying with his uncle Georg Kleine, the pastor of Ebergötzen. He had a friendship with the miller's son and neighbour, Erich Bachmann, and it is speculated that the tricks and experiences of the two boys are portrayed in "Max and Moritz".

Ebergötzen is home to two tourist attractions, the Wilhelm Busch Museum, and the European Bread Museum.

References

Göttingen (district)